Gorshechensky District is an administrative and municipal district (raion), one of the twenty-eight in Kursk Oblast, Russia. It is located in the east of the oblast. Its administrative center is the urban locality (a work settlement) of Gorshechnoye. Population:  22,835 (2002 Census);  The population of Gorshechnoye accounts for 34.8% of the district's total population.

Geography
Gorshechensky District is located in the south-east of Kursk Oblast.  The terrain is hilly plain averaging 200 meters above sea level; the district lies on the Central Russian Upland.  The main river in the district is the Oskol River, which flows out of the district to the south, where it empties into the Donets River, and ultimately the Don River.  The district is 110 km east of the city of Kursk, and 350 km south of Moscow.  The area measures 30 km (north-south), and 50 km (west-east).  The administrative center is the town of Gorshechnoye.

The district is bordered on the north by Kastorensky District, on the east by Nizhnedevitsky District of Voronezh Oblast, on the south by Starooskolsky District of Belgorod Oblast, and on the west by Manturovsky District.

References

Notes

Sources

External links
Gorshechensky District on Google Maps
Gorshechensky District on OpenStreetMap

Districts of Kursk Oblast